Marienwerder is a municipality in the district of Barnim in the state of Brandenburg, Germany.

Every summer, since 2004, in mid-July a two-day music festival called Inselleuchten takes place in Marienwerder. From 2007 on the popular actor and musician Axel Prahl hosted it as presenter and figurehead. In 2016 even Suzanne Vega gave a stage show here. Due to the COVID-19 pandemic the 2020 festival was canceled and rescheduled to 2021.

Demography

External links
Photo gallery of the  Inselleuchten festival years

References

Localities in Barnim